Unidad de Inteligencia Financiera (Financial Intelligence Unit) is the intelligence agency of the Argentine Ministry of Economy.

See also
National Intelligence System
National Intelligence School
Secretariat of Intelligence
National Directorate of Criminal Intelligence
National Directorate of Strategic Military Intelligence

Argentine intelligence agencies